United Nations Security Council resolution 746, adopted unanimously on 17 March 1992, after reaffirming Resolution 733 (1992), noting a ceasefire agreement in Mogadishu and a report by the Secretary-General, the Council urged the continuation of the United Nations humanitarian work in Somalia and strongly supported the Secretary-General's decision to dispatch a technical team there.

The Council urged the Somali factions to uphold the ceasefire agreement of 3 March 1992, further asking them to co-operate with the Secretary-General, the United Nations and international organisations to facilitate the delivery of humanitarian aid to those in need. It also supported his decision to dispatch a technical team to Somalia that would establish mechanisms for aid delivery and called on Somali factions to respect the safety and security of the team.

Finally, Resolution 746 encouraged co-operation between the Organisation of African Unity, Arab League and Organisation of the Islamic Conference and Secretary-General with the hope of convening a conference for national reconciliation and unity in Somalia.

See also
 History of Somalia
 List of United Nations Security Council Resolutions 701 to 800 (1991–1993)
 Somali Civil War

References

External links
 
Text of the Resolution at undocs.org

 0746
1992 in Somalia
 0746
United Nations operations in Somalia
March 1992 events